Greatest Hits is the first compilation album released by British trio N-Dubz, released following the announcement of the group's plans to go on a two-year hiatus. It was released in the United Kingdom on 28 November 2011 by Island Records. The album contains tracks from the band's three studio albums "Uncle B" (2008), "Against All Odds" (2009) and "Love.Live.Life" (2010). It includes fourteen of the group's singles, (excluding "Feva Las Vegas" and "We Dance On"), one album track, two live lounge covers and the original N-Dubz version of Dappy's first solo single, "No Regrets".
The album's release comes after the group announced an indefinite hiatus to focus on solo careers.

Following the announcement of their Back to the Future Tour in May 2022, the album saw a resurgence in popularity, surpassing the peak of 38 upon the album's original release, entering the top 10 at number 10 on 27 May 2022.

Critical reception

Jon O'Brien From AllMusic gave the album a mixed review Claiming that "Their Greatest Hits feels like a cynical cash-in that's appeared way too early in the band's career to make any impact." as well as criticizing the fact there are no new songs and that it did not include the song "We Dance On" which was a top 10 hit on the UK Singles Charts.

Track listing

Charts

Certifications

Release history

References

N-Dubz albums
2011 greatest hits albums